Rokeby Lock (also known as Rokeby) is an unincorporated community in Morgan County, in the U.S. state of Ohio.

History
Rokeby Lock was platted when a nearby lock and dam was being built on the Muskingum River. A post office was established at Rokeby Lock in 1839, and remained in operation until 1915.

References

Unincorporated communities in Morgan County, Ohio
Unincorporated communities in Ohio
1839 establishments in Ohio